The 40th Street station was a station on the now demolished BMT Fifth Avenue Line in Brooklyn, New York City. It was served by trains of the BMT Fifth Avenue Line. It had two tracks and one island platform. The station was built on October 1, 1893, and despite the name of the line was actually located on Third Avenue and 40th Street. It was the northernmost station on Third Street before the line shifted to the street that bore its name. The station had connections to four streetcar lines; The Church Avenue Line, 39th Street and Coney Island Line, 39th Street and Manhattan Beach Line, and 39th Street and Ulmer Park Line. The next stop to the north was 36th Street. The next stop to the south was 46th Street. The station closed on May 31, 1940.

References

 Fifth Avenue El

BMT Fifth Avenue Line stations
Railway stations in the United States opened in 1893
Railway stations closed in 1940
Former elevated and subway stations in Brooklyn
Sunset Park, Brooklyn